Professor David William Kissane, AC (born 1951) is an Australian psychiatrist specialising in psychiatric oncology and palliative care. Since 2018, he has been the inaugural Chair in Palliative Medicine Research at the University of Notre Dame Australia. He has also held professorships at the University of Melbourne (Foundation Professor and Director of Palliative Medicine, 1996–2003), Memorial Sloan Kettering Cancer Center in New York City (Chairman, Department of Psychiatry and Behavioral Sciences and inaugural Jimmie C. Holland Chair in Psychiatric Oncology, 2003–2012; concurrently Professor of Psychiatry at Weill Medical College of Cornell University), and Monash University (Head, Department of Psychiatry, 2012–2019). In 2008, he received the Arthur M. Sutherland Award of the International Psycho-Oncology Society (IPOS). On 26 January 2018 he was appointed a Companion of the Order of Australia. Professor Kissane has been described as an "opponent of euthanasia legislation who co-authored a landmark report with Dr Nitschke into the deaths that occurred under the NT's euthanasia laws".

In May 2020, he was awarded a AU$1.06 million grant for a research project on improving the care of palliative care patients with mental illness or emotional distress.

References 

1951 births
Australian psychiatrists
Companions of the Order of Australia
Living people
University of Notre Dame Australia people
Academic staff of the University of Melbourne
Academic staff of Monash University
Weill Medical College of Cornell University faculty
Knights of Malta